The Pretty Reckless is an American rock band from New York City, formed in 2009. The band consists of Taylor Momsen (lead vocals, rhythm guitar), Ben Phillips (lead guitar, backing vocals), Mark Damon (bass), and Jamie Perkins (drums).

The band released their debut studio album, Light Me Up, in August 2010. The album spawned three moderately successful singles, most notably "Make Me Wanna Die". The band released the Hit Me Like a Man EP in early 2012. In March 2014, the band released their second studio album, Going to Hell, which included the singles "Heaven Knows" and "Messed Up World" which topped the US and UK rock charts. The band's third studio album, Who You Selling For, was released on October 21, 2016, by Razor & Tie. The album spawned the single "Take Me Down", which earned the band their fourth number one on the US rock chart. The band's fourth studio album, Death by Rock and Roll, was released on February 12, 2021.  The Pretty Reckless became the first female-fronted band to have five number one singles when "Death by Rock and Roll" hit number one on the charts.

History

2009–2012: Formation, The Pretty Reckless EP and Light Me Up

For two years singer, rhythm guitarist and Gossip Girl actress Taylor Momsen worked with several producers before meeting Kato Khandwala. Momsen has said that she liked Khandwala because he was a rock producer as opposed to a pop producer. Khandwala introduced Momsen to Ben Phillips and the three of them began to write songs together. Three unnamed musicians were hired to form the band with Momsen. The band were originally called The Reckless, but had to change the name due to trademark problems. The band played its first concert on May 5, 2009 at The Annex in New York. After seven concerts the lineup of the band was changed. The new lineup of the band consisted of Momsen with John Secolo (guitar), Matt Chiarelli (bass) and Nick Carbone (drums). The second line-up of the band also played its first concert at The Annex on June 3, 2009. They recorded some demos in early 2009 and they opened for The Veronicas on their North American tour. In 2010, Secolo, Chiarelli and Carbone left the band.

At present, Momsen is the lead vocalist and rhythm guitarist, with Ben Phillips on lead guitar, Jamie Perkins on drums, and Mark Damon on bass, all of whom played in the band Famous in the early 2000s.

Momsen stated in an interview with OK! magazine that the band signed with Interscope Records and would be releasing their debut album in 2010. In an interview with QTV, Momsen reported the influences on the band to include The Beatles and Oasis, along with grunge band Nirvana. She also stated that her personal influences include Kurt Cobain, Joan Jett, and Robert Plant. After the band announced they had signed to Interscope Records, two new recordings of demo songs ("He Loves You" and "Zombie") were posted on their Myspace account.

On December 30, 2009, the band released a new promo song entitled "Make Me Wanna Die". The song was offered as a limited-time free download for fans on their Interscope Records website. The band launched "Make Me Wanna Die" on the soundtrack and it appeared in the end credits of the 2010 film Kick-Ass. The song was the band's first single, and was released on May 17, 2010, with the debut album set to be released in August. On April 9, 2010, they performed during the "Vans Warped Tour 2010 Kick-Off Party" and performed at The Bamboozle music festival on May 1, 2010. They played the entire Warped Tour 2010.

Their first EP was released on June 22, 2010, to mixed reactions. Rolling Stone magazine classified the sound as "generic". It contained four songs, three of which can be found on their debut album: "Make Me Wanna Die", "My Medicine", and "Goin' Down". The first single "Make Me Wanna Die" was released on May 17, 2010. A viral video was released to promote the single. The full record was released on August 31, 2010.

"Miss Nothing" was the second single to be released from Light Me Up. It was aired exclusively on British radio station BBC Radio 1, on July 22, 2010. The band introduced it as their next UK single after a show on the Warped Tour. A video for "Miss Nothing" was released on July 20 on Vevo. The US release of Light Me Up was delayed until February 2011. The first single released in the US officially was "Just Tonight", which was the third single released in Australia and United Kingdom among other countries.

The Evanescence Tour was the third worldwide concert tour by American rock band Evanescence. The Pretty Reckless were the support act. Taylor Momsen stated she was a "big fan of Evanescence, so it's really exciting to be opening for them". The band opened for Evanescence at the historic Hollywood Palladium in Los Angeles. Evanescence singer Amy Lee told MTV News about Momsen: "She's got a great voice; she's real sweet", and laughingly said that being one of Momsen's first concerts makes her feel "old, but very, very flattered." Guns N' Roses' Chinese Democracy Tour confirmed The Pretty Reckless as an opening act for three tour dates in November 2011.

2012 saw the release of two singles from the album, "You" and "My Medicine". Videos for both singles were released - "You" featuring Momsen in a small empty apartment playing the guitar, and "My Medicine" featuring Momsen at an out-of-control party as she sings about being under the influence of alcohol and drugs. Later 2012 she appeared in a video completely naked. In the video entitled "The Words - Under The Water", Momsen appeared in a black-and-white film while saying the lyrics like reciting a poem. By the time the video ends, Momsen appears without her clothes on and her private parts blurred.

2012–2014: Hit Me Like a Man EP, commercial success with Going to Hell

The Medicine Tour was the second headlining concert tour by The Pretty Reckless in support of their 2010 debut album Light Me Up and their 2012 extended play Hit Me Like a Man EP. The tour dates were announced on January 23, 2012 via the band's official website. The band performed at several of the same venues they had visited the previous year, with 52 shows in North America, 5 shows in South America and 2 shows in Asia. Their second extended play Hit Me Like a Man EP was released on March 6, 2012. It featured three new songs, as well as live performances of two songs from Light Me Up. A new song by the band titled "Only You" was included as a bonus track of Frankenweenie Unleashed!, the soundtrack album of Frankenweenie (2012). On December 11, The Pretty Reckless' fourth single "Kill Me" was released. The song was featured at the end of the final episode of the series Gossip Girl.

On May 30, 2013, The Pretty Reckless released a teaser trailer for their second studio album Going to Hell, set for release later that year. On June 17, 2013, The Pretty Reckless released a new track titled "Follow Me Down". On July 1, 2013, Momsen released the song "Burn", which will also be on Going to Hell.

The song "Going to Hell" premiered on September 19, 2013. On the same day as the premier of the new track "Going to Hell", The Pretty Reckless also announced their signing to the label Razor & Tie. On September 20, 2013, The Pretty Reckless began the Going to Hell Tour to support the album, together with groups of Heaven's Basement and Louna. The "Going to Hell" official music video premiered on October 16, 2013 on Vevo. November 19, 2013 marked the release of first single "Heaven Knows", which premiered on SiriusXM's Octane on November 15, 2013. The music video appeared on February 13, 2014.

Going to Hell was released on March 18, 2014. The release marked the band's largest sales week to date and landed at number five on the Billboard 200 with over 35,000 copies sold in its first week. Much of the inspiration for the album came from Momsen's Catholic background, noting that "heaven and hell is a metaphor that's been used in music since the beginning of time".

When the singles "Heaven Knows" and "Messed Up World (F'd Up World)" topped the US Mainstream Rock chart, The Pretty Reckless became the second female-fronted band to achieve two number ones in a row on the chart, following The Pretenders. 2014 also saw Momsen performing at the Revolver Magazine Golden Gods awards alongside Joan Jett and ZZ Top guitarist Billy Gibbons. The band also performed "Heaven Knows", "Fucked Up World", and "Going to Hell" at the awards show.

2016–2019: Who You Selling For
In the beginning of September 2015, Momsen confirmed that the band was working on new material in the studio. Writing for the album began shortly after the completion of two years of touring in support of the band's second studio album, Going to Hell (2014). "We had so much we wanted to say, it was like shaking a can of soda on tour, and then when we started writing we cracked the seal", Momsen said. "The touring life is very isolating. You look at the world through a bus or airplane window. But music is the healing factor. It's the one thing that is grounding and a true companion through the forest. It saved us—again." On April 14, 2016, Momsen confirmed via Twitter that the new album was almost finished. The lead single from the band's third studio album, "Take Me Down", had its world premiere on iHeartRadio stations on July 14, 2016 and became the band's fourth single to top the Mainstream Rock chart. The single was released digitally the next day, and was serviced to US active rock radio on July 19. The band's third studio album, Who You Selling For, was released on October 21, 2016 by Razor & Tie.

In support of the album, the band embarked on the Who You Selling For Tour, which kicked off on October 20, 2016 in Tulsa, Oklahoma. The official music video for the album's second single "Oh My God" was released on February 8, 2017. During the tour, on May 17, 2017, the band was the opening act for Soundgarden during lead vocalist Chris Cornell's last performance, at the Fox Theater in Detroit, Michigan, before he committed suicide. The Pretty Reckless paid tribute to Cornell by performing a cover version of Audioslave's "Like a Stone" on May 20 at the Philadelphia radio station WMMR's annual MMR-B-Q at BB&T Pavilion in Camden, New Jersey. A third single, "Back to the River", featuring Warren Haynes of the Allman Brothers Band was released on June 13, 2017.

2020–present: Death by Rock and Roll and Other Worlds

In November 2019, Momsen revealed on Instagram that the band was working on their fourth studio album with Matt Cameron of Pearl Jam and Soundgarden. In February 2020, Momsen confirmed the album's completion and revealed its title, Death by Rock and Roll. The album was released on February 12, 2021. In May 2020, the band signed with Fearless Records. The lead single, which is the title track of the album, was released on May 15, 2020. The band's tour was set to begin in September 2020, having been delayed from May 2020 due to the COVID-19 pandemic.

The Pretty Reckless became the first female-fronted band to have five number one singles when "Death by Rock and Roll" rose to the top of the Mainstream Rock Chart. The Halloween-themed "Broomsticks" was released in late October, and "25" was released on November 13. In January 2021, the band released "And So It Went" featuring Tom Morello as the next single for Death by Rock and Roll. Momsen stated that the song comments on the world's current "civil unrest": "The world has been in such a state of civil unrest. 'And So It Went' basically comes from that vision. As a songwriter, I feel like I'm not here to preach. I use music to observe and communicate what I see around me."

The band embarked on the Death by Rock and Roll Tour in support of the album in March and April 2022 touring with Shinedown; and then with Halestorm beginning in June 2022. The tour visited the UK and Ireland in October and November 2022. In August 2022, the band announced the upcoming release of Other Worlds, a compilation album containing alternate versions of previously released songs and new covers, for November 4 that year. A remix of "Got So High" from Death by Rock and Roll was released as a single ahead of the compilation's release.

Musical style
The Pretty Reckless has been described as hard rock post-grunge, and alternative rock.

Momsen possesses a mezzo-soprano vocal range.

Live performances
The band opened the V Festival in the UK in 2010.  The band embarked on a four-date UK tour starting in Glasgow, Scotland at the Barrowland Ballroom on December 13, 2010, supported by Francesqa.

In 2011, the band announced a tour running from early February to late March. The band appeared at the Download Festival in June. A planned performance at the Soundwave Revolution, an Australian music festival, was cancelled. During the summer, the band performed in several European festivals such as Rock Am Ring in June, Optimus Alive! on July 8 in Portugal, Rock Werchter on July 2 in Belgium, Wireless Festival on July 3, Montreux Jazz Festival in Montreux, Switzerland on July 4 and T in the Park on July 10 in Scotland. On August 6, 2011, the band performed at the 2011 Lollapalooza festival in Chicago, Illinois. The Pretty Reckless opened several Evanescence shows in October and November with two gigs at the HMV Hammersmith Apollo in London among others. On October 8, 2011, the band performed at the 2011 Tulsa State Fair in Tulsa, Oklahoma. On October 26, 2011, the band performed at Ritual nightclub in Ottawa, Ontario, with guests Static Revolt and The Escape Mode.

In January 2012, the band released tour dates for its second headlining tour, The Medicine Tour. Directly following those tour dates, the Pretty Reckless supported Marilyn Manson on their current tour, Hey Cruel World... Tour. In July 2012, The Pretty Reckless arrived in Argentina for the first time. The band's show was on July 29 in Buenos Aires. In September 2012, The Pretty Reckless headlined the Bazooka Rocks Festival in Manila, Philippines, ending their The Medicine Tour. On September 20, 2013 the band kicked off the first leg of their third tour, the Going to Hell Tour, in North America.

Band members
Current members
 Taylor Momsen – lead vocals, rhythm guitar (2009–present)
 Ben Phillips – lead guitar, backing vocals (2010–present)
 Jamie Perkins – drums (2010–present)
 Mark Damon – bass (2010–present)

Former members
 Nick Carbone – drums (2009–2010)
 Matt Chiarelli – bass (2009–2010)
 John Secolo – lead guitar (2009–2010)

Timeline

Discography

 Light Me Up (2010)
 Going to Hell (2014)
 Who You Selling For (2016)
 Death by Rock and Roll (2021)

Tours

Headlining 
 Light Me Up Tour (2010–2012)
 The Medicine Tour (2012)
 Going to Hell Tour (2013–2015)
 Who You Selling For Tour (2016–2017)
 Death by Rock and Roll Tour (2022-2023)

Festivals 
 Part of Warped Tour (2010)

Awards and nominations
{| class="wikitable"
|- "
! Year
! Ceremony
! Category 
! Work
! Result
|-
|rowspan=2| 2010
| rowspan=2| Virgin Media Music Award
| Best Group
|rowspan=2 
| 
|-
| Best Newcomer
| 
|-
| 2012
| Revolver
| Song of the Year
| "Kill Me"
| 
|-
| rowspan=3| 2014
| Independent Music Awards
| Best 'Difficult' Second Album
| Going to Hell
| 
|-
| Kerrang Awards
| Hottest Female
| Taylor Momsen
| 
|-
| RadioContraband Awards
| New Artist of the Year
| rowspan=4 
| 
|-
| rowspan=4| 2017
| rowspan=2| Alternative Press Music Awards
|Best Hard Rock Band
|
|-
|Artist of the Year
|
|-
| Loudwire Music Awards
| Hard Rock Artist of the Year
| 
|-
| iHeartRadio Music Awards
| Rock Song of the Year
| "Take Me Down"
| 
|-
| rowspan=3| 2021
| rowspan=2| iHeartRadio Music Awards
| Rock Artist of the Year
| 
| 
|-
| Rock Song of the Year
| "Death by Rock And Roll"
| 
|-
| Teraz Rock Awards
| Best Foreign Album of the Year
| Death by Rock and Roll
| 
|-
| rowspan=2| 2022
| rowspan=2| iHeartRadio Music Awards
| Rock Artist of the Year
| 
| 
|-
| Rock Song of the Year
| "And So It Went"
| 
|-

References

External links

 
 

Alternative rock groups from New York (state)
American post-grunge musical groups
Century Media Records artists
Cooking Vinyl artists
Fearless Records artists
Hard rock musical groups from New York (state)
Interscope Records artists
Musical groups established in 2009
Musical groups from New York City
Musical quartets
Razor & Tie artists
Female-fronted musical groups